Ocean Ridge Airport  is a privately owned public-use airport located three nautical miles (6 km) north of the central business district of Gualala, in Mendocino County, California, United States. Recently the airport has been threatened with closure by state unless repairs are made.

Facilities and aircraft 
It has one runway designated 13/31 with an asphalt surface measuring 2,500 by 50 feet (762 x 15 m).

For the 12-month period ending November 21, 2008, the airport had 5,000 general aviation aircraft operations, an average of 13 per day. At that time there were 21 aircraft based at this airport: 95% single-engine and 5% multi-engine.

References

External links 
 Ocean Ridge Airport website
 E55 - Ocean Ridge/Gualala, California
 Aerial image as of 12 July 1993 from USGS The National Map

Airports in Mendocino County, California